Jairo Correa (born 2 October 1954) is a former Colombian mountain runner who won two World Mountain Running Championships (1989, 1991).

Biography
He won three times the Swiss race Sierre-Zinal (1990, 1993, 1995).

References

External links
 Jairo Correa profile at Association of Road Racing Statisticians

1954 births
Living people
Place of birth missing (living people)
Colombian mountain runners
Colombian male long-distance runners
Colombian male marathon runners
Colombian male steeplechase runners
Colombian masters athletes
Competitors at the 1974 Central American and Caribbean Games
Central American and Caribbean Games silver medalists for Colombia
World Mountain Running Championships winners
Central American and Caribbean Games medalists in athletics
20th-century Colombian people